Hechtia conzattiana is a plant species in the genus Hechtia. This species is endemic to Mexico.

References

conzattiana
Flora of Mexico